Klinghoffer is a German surname.  Notable people with the surname include:

 Clara Klinghoffer (1900–1970), Austrian-born English artist.
 David Klinghoffer, author and essayist at the Discovery Institute, and proponent of intelligent design
 Josh Klinghoffer (born 1979), musician and record producer from Los Angeles, California, and former guitarist for the Red Hot Chili Peppers
 Leon Klinghoffer (1916–1985), disabled American who was murdered and thrown overboard in the hijacking of the cruise ship Achille Lauro in 1985 
 Yitzhak Klinghoffer (1905–1990), Israeli jurist and politician

See also 

 The Death of Klinghoffer, opera by contemporary American composer John Adams

German-language surnames